Patricia Williams Stone  is an American nurse. During the COVID-19 pandemic, Stone was elected to the National Academy of Medicine for her "expertise and sustained scholarly efforts in real-world comparative and economic evaluations of improving the quality of care and specifically preventing health care-associated infections."

Early life and education
Stone completed her registered nurse designation at the State University of New York before enrolling at Harvard University for her Master of Public Health. She then completed her PhD at the University of Rochester.

Career
During the COVID-19 pandemic, Stone and colleagues Sonia Y. Angell, Andrea Baccarelli, Wendy Chung, and Kam W. Leong were elected to the National Academy of Medicine. She was elected due to her "expertise and sustained scholarly efforts in real-world comparative and economic evaluations of improving the quality of care and specifically preventing health care-associated infections." She was also named to the Mitre Corporation's 25-member independent Coronavirus Commission for Safety and Quality in Nursing Homes. In 2021, Stone officially stepped up as editor in chief of the American Journal of Infection Control following the retirement of Elaine Larson.

References

Living people
American nurses
American nursing administrators
Columbia University School of Nursing faculty
State University of New York alumni
University of Rochester alumni
Harvard University alumni
Members of the National Academy of Medicine
Fellows of the American Academy of Nursing
Medical journal editors
Year of birth missing (living people)